Ladies in Blue is a Canadian documentary film, directed by Claude Demers and released in 2009. The film is a portrait of five women of varying ages who are passionate fans of Quebec singer Michel Louvain.

The film received a Genie Award nomination for Best Feature Length Documentary at the 30th Genie Awards in 2010.

References

External links
 

2009 films
2009 documentary films
Canadian documentary films
Quebec films
French-language Canadian films
2000s Canadian films